Doubrava (German: Grün) is a village in Karlovy Vary Region, Czech Republic. It is one of the nine districts of the town of Aš. In 2001 the village had a population of 94.

In the village there are a mineral spring, a bus stop, a market and a restaurant.

Geography 
Doubrava lies 6 kilometres northeast from Aš, about 507 meters above sea level. It is surrounded by forests. Through Doubrava flows Bílý Halštrov river.

History 
Doubrava is first mentioned in 1392, as a property of Conrad von Neuberg. At the turn of the 14th and 15th century Doubrava was bought by the Zedtwitz.

Mineral springs in Doubrava has very similar composition like those in neighboring German town of Bad Elster. But they are not used for medical purposes yet. Town of Aš plans change in future and revitalise this village.

Landmarks 
 Chateau Doubrava from 17th century,
 Tomb of Zedtwitz,
 Wooden cemetery morgue.

Gallery

References 

Aš
Villages in Cheb District